Trumpers Crossing Halte was a station of scant construction on the Brentford Branch Line of the Great Western Railway, which ran from  to Brentford Dock.

History
It was opened on 2 May 1904 by the Great Western Railway as "Trumpers Crossing Halte", and was the only intermediate station between Southall and Brentford GWR stations. At this time, the GWR favoured the French spelling of "Halte" for such stations, because the English word "Halt" had an inappropriate meaning.

The halt closed on 22 March 1915 as a wartime economy measure, re-opened on 12 April 1920 and closed permanently on 1 February 1926. Before closing for good, the words "for South Hanwell and Osterley Park" were appended.

Materials from the redundant platforms were used six months later to construct , which opened on 20 September 1926.

Route

Notes

References

External links
 Photo at fotopic

Former Great Western Railway stations
Railway stations in Great Britain opened in 1904
Railway stations in Great Britain closed in 1915
Railway stations in Great Britain opened in 1920
Railway stations in Great Britain closed in 1926
Disused railway stations in the London Borough of Ealing